The Hutch Award is given annually to an active Major League Baseball (MLB) player who "best exemplifies the fighting spirit and competitive desire" of Fred Hutchinson, by persevering through adversity. The award was created in 1965 in honor of Hutchinson, the former MLB pitcher and manager, who died of lung cancer the previous year. The Hutch Award was created by Hutch's longtime friends Bob Prince, a broadcaster for the Pittsburgh Pirates and KDKA; Jim Enright, a Chicago sportswriter; and Ritter Collett, the sports editor of the Dayton Journal Herald.  They also created a scholarship fund for medical students engaged in cancer research to honor Hutchinson's memory.

Eleven members of the National Baseball Hall of Fame have won the Hutch Award. The inaugural winner was Mickey Mantle. Danny Thompson, the 1974 recipient, was diagnosed with leukemia earlier that year.  He continued to play through the 1976 season before dying that December at the age of 29. Jon Lester won the award in 2008 after recovering from anaplastic large-cell lymphoma.

The award is presented annually at the Hutch Award Luncheon hosted by the Fred Hutchinson Cancer Research Center in Seattle, Washington, at Safeco Field. The award was originally presented at the annual Dapper Dan Banquet in Pittsburgh. Each winner receives a copy of the original trophy, designed by Dale Chihuly. The permanent display of the Hutch Award is at the National Baseball Hall of Fame in Cooperstown, New York, where it has been since 1979.

Recipients

See also

Heart & Hustle Award
Players Choice Awards Majestic Athletic Always Game Award
Willie Mac Award
Baseball awards in the United States
List of MLB awards

References

External links

Awards established in 1965
Major League Baseball trophies and awards